Lê Quốc Khánh (born 2 September 1982) is a Vietnamese tennis player.

Lê has a career high ATP singles ranking of 1317 achieved on 23 August 2004. He also has a career high ATP doubles ranking of 959 achieved on 10 July 2006.

Lê represents Vietnam at the Davis Cup, where he has a W/L record of 28–28.

External links

1982 births
Living people
Vietnamese male tennis players
Sportspeople from Ho Chi Minh City
Tennis players at the 2006 Asian Games
Tennis players at the 2010 Asian Games
Southeast Asian Games bronze medalists for Vietnam
Southeast Asian Games medalists in tennis
Competitors at the 2007 Southeast Asian Games
Asian Games competitors for Vietnam
Competitors at the 2019 Southeast Asian Games
Competitors at the 2021 Southeast Asian Games
20th-century Vietnamese people
21st-century Vietnamese people